The 8th Rivers State House of Assembly is the current session of the Rivers State legislature. It was formed after the 11 April and 18 2015 elections. Representatives of the Assembly were elected from 32 constituencies with members of the People's Democratic Party (PDP) in the majority. The Assembly was inaugurated on 1 June 2015. The elected presiding officer (Speaker) was Ikuinyi O. Ibani, until 19 December, when he resigned and was replaced by Adams Dabotorudima.
In December 2016, Ikuinyi O. Ibani was re-elected as the Speaker of the Rivers State House of Assembly.

Leadership

Members

References

External links

Rivers State House of Assembly
2015 establishments in Nigeria
2010s establishments in Rivers State